This is a list of notable people from Haryana.

Academics
 Dr. Sarup Singh (1917–2003), Vice Chancellor, University of Delhi (1971–74), Governor of Gujarat and Kerala.
 Dr. Brijendra Kumar Rao, Padma Bhushan, former chairman of Sir Ganga Ram Hospital, New Delhi and member of Medical Council of India
 Dr. Bhim Singh Dahiya, Vice Chancellor, Kurukshetra University (1993-96).
J.B. Chaudhary.

Authors 
 Dayachand Mayna
 Preeti Singh
 Murari Lal Sharma (Neeras)
 Pandit Lakhmi Chand, Surya Kavi Of Haryana
 Ram Swarup

Arts, entertainment, and films

Actors and models
Manushi Chhillar, is an Indian model from Sonipat and beauty pageant titleholder who was crowned Miss World 2017
Dayachand Mayna, was an actor, songwriter, poet, singer who wrote many raagni, songs, Saang, Kissas, he was from Mayna (Rohtak)
Satish Kaushik, born in Dhanoda Mahendergarh
Jagat Jakhar was a Haryanvi film actor famous as hero of the Haryanvi movie Chandrawal.
Jaideep Ahlawat, born in Village Kharkara Rohtak.
Parul Gulati , born in Rohtak is an Indian actress who has appeared mainly in Punjabi movies
Juhi Chawla, born in Ambala is an Indian actress who appears mainly in Bollywood films. 
Baje Bhagat, was very famous classical singer of Haryanvi Dialects.
Mallika Sherawat, born in Rohtak is an Indian actress who appears mainly in Bollywood films.
Manish Joshi Bismil, born in Hisar is a theatre actor, director, puppeteer and magician.
Om Puri, born in Ambala.
Parineeti Chopra, born in Ambala.
Rajkummar Rao, born in Gurgaon.
Randeep Hooda, born in Jaseya, Rohtak.
Srishti Rana Born in Faridabad is an Indian beauty queen.
Sunil Dutt from Mandoli in Yamuna Nagar district
Usha Sharma - a Haryanvi film actress famous as heroine of the Haryanvi movie Chandrawal.
Yash Tonk, born in Sonipat.
Yashpal Sharma (actor), born in Hisar.
Mohit Ahlawat (actor)

Comedian
Sunil Grover, born in mandi Dabwali, Sirsa.
Parvinder Singh (Haryanvi Youtuber), Born in Charkhi Dadri
Sohit Soni is an Indian actor from Fridabad.
CarryMinati is an Indian YouTuber, born in Faridabad.

Arts and architecture
Nek Chand Saini (1924–2015) Rock Garden fame.

Singers and writers
 Dayachand Mayna was a songwriter, poet, singer who wrote many raagni, songs, Saang, Kissas, he was from Mayna (Rohtak)
Baje Bhagat was a songwriter, poet, singer who wrote many ragni, songs, he was from sisana village, sonipat.
Gajendra Verma is a Sirsa-born composer and playback singer
Ghulam Farid Sabri Qawwal, a leading member of the Sabri Brothers/Qawwali Group. He was born in 1930 Kalyana, Rohtak, Haryana/East Punjab.
Pandit Jasraj is a Hisar born classical singer of Mewati gharana style
Pandit Lakhmi Chand, Surya Kavi Of Haryana
Sonu Nigam, born in Faridabad.
Zohrabai Ambalewali (1918-1990), Born in Ambala, Indian classical singer and playback singer in Hindi cinema in the 1930s and 40s.
Lalit Pandit, Bollywood composer
Jatin Pandit,  Bollywood composer
Sanjay Saini Sanju, Movie Writer 
Paras Lohchab , Singer and Writer

Poet
 Alhar Bikaneri
 Sardar Anjum
 Baje Bhagat
 Lakhmi Chand
 Hari Singh Dilbar
 Altaf Hussain Hali
 Uday Bhanu Hans
 Dayachand Mayna
 Ghulam Bhik Nairang
 Murari Lal Sharma (Neeras)
 Samartha Vashishtha
 Sajida Zaidi
 Kashmiri Lal Zakir
 Nasir Kazmi
 Saghar Siddiqui

Journalist

Editorial cartoonist
Shekhar Gurera born in Moga in 1965, living in Gurgaon since 1986.

Journalists
Mandeep Punia, Freelance Journalist, 

Vijender Kumar  Times of India 

Deepender Deswal  The Tribune

Television journalists
Rohit Sardana

Business

Baba Ramdev from Patanjali Ayurved Ltd, born in Mahendragarh.
O.P. Jindal, Former Member of Parliament, Haryana Power Minister, Founder — Jindal Group of Companies, hailing from Hissar
Sajjan Jindal, industrialist son of O.P. Jindal, hailing from Hisar, India.
Subhash Chandra, Founder Zee TV, Chairman ESSEL Group.
Sameer Gehlaut one of India's youngest self-made billionaire at just 34 years of age
Naveen Jindal Former Member of Parliament & Chairman of Jindal Steel and Power Limited.
Savitri Jindal Former Minister, Haryana Government & Chairman OP Jindal Group.

Rulers
Adityavardhana, King of Thanesar
Anangpal Tomar, king of Tomara dynasty
Harsha, king of North India
Hemu Bhargav, King of Delhi
Prabhakaravardhana, king of North India
Rajyavardhana, king of North India
 Rao Tula Ram, King of Rewari
 Rao Gopal Dev, king of Rewari

Military
General Deepak Kapoor, Chief of the Army Staff (India) 2007–10.
General VK Singh, Chief of the Army Staff (India) 2010–12.
General Dalbir Singh Suhag, Chief of the Army Staff (India) 2014–2016, born in Bishan village, Jhajjar, Haryana
Major general Rao Farman Ali Khan, born 1923 in, Rohtak, Haryana/East Punjab,(Unit: 26th Field Artillery Regiment, Pak Army). He fought World War-II, Indo-Pak war 47,65,71 ...
Hemu.
General Vijay Kumar Singh, born in Bapora, Bhiwani.
Hon. Captain Umrao Singh Yadav (1920–2005), born in Palra, Jhajjar, recipient of Victoria Cross (VC).
Lt.Colonel Hoshiar Singh, born in Sisana, Sonipat, recipient of Param Vir Chakra (1971 war).
 Lieutenant Colonel Dharam Singh was born on 10 July 1910 in village Badesara, Bhiwani district, Haryana. For his gallantry he received the Maha Vir Chakra (MVC) on 8 November 1948.
 Lance Naik Hari Singh was born on 26 September 1920 in Badanpur village, Jind district, Haryana. For his gallantry he was awarded the Maha Vir Chakra (MVC) on 17 March 1948.
Subedar Richhpal Ram (20 August 1899 – 12 February 1941), born in Barda, Mahendragarh, recipient of Victoria Cross (VC) on 4 July 1941.
Babru Bhan Yadav (14 September 1928 – 22 January 2010), Indian Navy commander, recipient of Maha Vir Chakra in 1971.
Major Mohit Sharma (Ashok Chakra winner 2009)

Politicians
 Nawabzada Liaquat Ali Khan - 1st Prime Minister of Pakistan, 1st Foreign Minister of Pakistan, 1st Defence Minister of Pakistan & 1st Finance Minister of India. He born (1 October 1895) in Karnal, Haryana/East Punjab.
 Abhimanyu Sindhu - BJP National Secretary and BJP National Spokesperson
Arvind Kejriwal, from Hisar, Haryana, the Chief Minister of Delhi.
Ashok Tanwar former National President of NSUI and Indian Youth Congress, Ex.MP from Sirsa and currently the president of Haryana Pradesh Congress Committee.
Avtar Singh Bhadana born in Faridabad is a member of the 14th Lok Sabha of India. He represents the Faridabad constituency of Haryana and is a prominent leader of Gurjars and a member of the Indian National Congress (INC) political party.
B. D. Sharma, first Chief Minister of the state 
Bansi Lal, former Chief Minister of Haryana, former Railway Minister of India
Bhajan Lal, former Chief Minister of Haryana.
Bhupinder Singh Hooda, born in rohtak. is an Indian politician and leader of the Indian National Congress who has been Chief Minister of Haryana[1] since March 2005.
Chaudhary Khurshid Ahmed (born 1934), lawyer in the Supreme Court of India and a politician who has served as the Member of Parliament from Faridabad, Haryana.
Devi Lal, former Chief Minister of Haryana, 6th Deputy Prime Minister of India
Dinesh Kaushik (born 1960), Member of Legislative Assembly from Pundri, Haryana and social activist.
Babu Mool Chand Jain, PWD, B&R Minister (1956), Finance Minister (1967 & 1978), Leader of the Opposition (1980-1982), Deputy Chairman Planning Board (1987-1989)
Om Prakash Chautala Former Chief Minister of Haryana, son of Devi Lal
Rana Muhammad Iqbal Khan__Born in Karnal, Haryana/East Punjab, 9th & 10th(current)Speaker Provincial Assembly of the Punjab.
Rana Phool Muhammad Khan__Born in Karnal, Haryana/East Punjab, Best Politician.Founder of Phool Nagar
Rao Birender Singh was the second chief minister of Haryana.
Rao Hashim Khan Born in Balyali Village, Bawani Kheda tehsil, Bhiwani district, Haryana/East Punjab.
Rao Muhammad Afzal Khan, Born in 1925 in Kalanaur, Rohtak District, Haryana/East Punjab.
Rao Sikandar Iqbal, from Kalanaur, Haryana/East Punjab, 25th Defence Minister of Pakistan from 2002 to 2007.
Sagar Ram Gupta, from Bhiwani, Haryana. He is a two time MLA and Cabinet Minister of Haryana.
Sushma Swaraj, born in Ambala. She is a former Union Cabinet Minister of India and a former Chief Minister of Delhi. She was the country's youngest Cabinet Minister at 25 years of age (1977).
 Om Prakash Dhankar (born 1961), Haryana politician, President BJP Kisan Morcha
H. R. Bhardwaj, (born 1937), former Governor of Karnataka state from 2009 to 2014 and Union Cabinet Minister of the Ministry of Law and Justice (India) from 2004 to 2009 in the cabinet of Manmohan Singh, born in Rohtak district.
D.P. Vats, Politician from Haryana.
Ram Bilas Sharma (politician)
Gopal Goyal Kanda MLA of Sirsa district and member of Haryana Legislative Assembly.

Revolutionaries and freedom fighters
 Sir Chhotu Ram (1881–1945).
 Deshbandhu Gupta (1901-1951), independence campaigner
 Dharam Singh Hayatpur, revolutionary leader.
 Nihal Singh Takshak also former Education Inspector with Birla Institute Pilani.
 Ranbir Singh Hooda, Member of the first Constituent Assembly that framed Indian Constitution. Died 2009.
 Rao Tula Ram, revolutionary leader in 1857 revolt from Rewari district.
 Seth Chhaju Ram
 Babu Mool Chand Jain, Jailed for Individual Civil Disobedience Movement (1941), Quit India Movement (1942).
Pandit Neki Ram Sharma, Freedom fighter and Haryana Kesari

Sports

Athletics
Neeraj Chopra, Javelin thrower

Badminton
Saina Nehwal

Boxing
Dinesh Kumar, born in Bhiwani.
Jagdish Singh, born in Bhiwani.
Manoj Kumar, born in Rajound, Kaithal district.
Vijender Singh, born in Bhiwani.
Vikas Krishan Yadav, born in Singhwa Khas, Hisar district.
Manish Kaushik, born in Bhiwani

Cricket
Virender Sehwag, born in Jhajjar District
Ajay Ratra, born in Faridabad.
Amit Mishra
Ashish Nehra
Barinder Sran
Chetan Sharma
Joginder Sharma, born in Rohtak.
Joginder Rao, born in Gurgaon.
Kapil Dev, born in Haryana.
Manvinder Bisla
Mohit Sharma
Nitin Saini
Yuzvendra Chahal

Hockey
Jasjeet Kaur Handa.
Mamta Kharab, born in Rohtak.
Pritam Rani Siwach, born in Jharsa, Gurgaon.
Sandeep Singh
Sardara Singh
Sita Gussain
Suman Bala, born in Shahbad Markanda.
Surinder, born in Shahbad.
Savita Punia, born on 11 July 1990 in Jodhkan village of Sirsa district in Haryana.

Kabaddi
Ramesh Kumar (born 1976), Arjuna Award (2005)
 Anup Kumar (born 1983, Palra, Gurugram district), Arjuna Award (2012)
 Sunil Dabas (born Mohammadpur Majra village, Jhajjar district) coach national female Kabbadi team, Dronacharya Award (2012), Padma Shri (2014)

Mountaineering
Santosh Yadav, born in Joniyawas, Rewari. Scaled Mt. Everest Twice in One Year.

Volleyball
Balwant Singh (volleyball), born in Kaul, Kaithal district.
Dalel Singh Ror, born in Amin, Kurukshetra.

Wrestling
Yogeshwar Dutt
Ravi Kumar Dahiya, Sonipat district
Bajrang Punia, Jhajjar district
Chandgi Ram, born in Sisai, Hisar district.
Sakshi Malik.
Geeta Phogat, born in Bhiwani.
Lila Ram, born in Mandola, Bhiwani district
Suman Kundu, born in Kalwa, Jind.
Gurvinder Singh Malhotra, Yamunanagar district

Shooting
 Kajal Saini
 Gagan Narang from Panipat district
 Manu Bhaker from Jhajjar district

Paralympics
Sumit Antil
Manish Narwal

Zaildars during British rule
Chaudhari Nand Ram Saini

References

Haryana

People